Park Street is a street in the central business district of Sydney in New South Wales, Australia. It runs from George Street in the west to College Street in the east, where it becomes William Street.

Description

Park Street bisects Hyde Park, the oldest park in Australia. The street also gets its name from the nearby park, Hyde Park. The park was created in 1810 by Governor Macquarie and has a state heritage listing.
Publishing and Broadcasting Limited and its successor, Consolidated Media Holdings, had their corporate headquarters at 54 Park Street.

An electric tramway formerly ran down Park Street between Elizabeth and College Streets. It was removed in 1960.

See also

References

External links

  [CC-By-SA]

Streets in Sydney
Sydney central business district